Water reclamation (also called wastewater reuse, water reuse or water recycling) is the process of converting municipal wastewater (sewage) or industrial wastewater into water that can be reused for a variety of purposes. Types of reuse include: urban reuse, agricultural reuse (irrigation), environmental reuse, industrial reuse, planned potable reuse, de facto wastewater reuse (unplanned potable reuse). For example, reuse may include irrigation of gardens and agricultural fields or replenishing surface water and groundwater (i.e., groundwater recharge). Reused water may also be directed toward fulfilling certain needs in residences (e.g. toilet flushing), businesses, and industry, and could even be treated to reach drinking water standards. The injection of reclaimed water into the water supply distribution system is known as direct potable reuse, however, drinking reclaimed water is not a typical practice. Treated municipal wastewater reuse for irrigation is a long-established practice, especially in arid countries. Reusing wastewater as part of sustainable water management allows water to remain as an alternative water source for human activities. This can reduce scarcity and alleviate pressures on groundwater and other natural water bodies.

There are several technologies used to treat wastewater for reuse. A combination of these technologies can meet strict treatment standards and make sure that the processed water is hygienically safe, meaning free from pathogens. The following are some of the typical technologies: Ozonation, ultrafiltration, aerobic treatment (membrane bioreactor), forward osmosis, reverse osmosis, advanced oxidation. Some water demanding activities do not require high grade water. In this case, wastewater can be reused with little or no treatment.

The cost of reclaimed water exceeds that of potable water in many regions of the world, where a fresh water supply is plentiful. The costs of water reclamation options might be compared to the costs of alternatives options which also achieve similar effects of freshwater savings, namely greywater reuse systems, rainwater harvesting and stormwater recovery, or seawater desalination.

Water recycling and reuse is of increasing importance, not only in arid regions but also in cities and contaminated environments. Municipal wastewater reuse is particularly high in the Middle East and North Africa region, in countries such as the UAE, Qatar, Kuwait and Israel.

Definition 
The term "water reuse" is generally used interchangeably with terms such as wastewater reuse, water reclamation, water recycling. A definition by the USEPA states: "Water reuse is the method of recycling treated wastewater for beneficial purposes, such as agricultural and landscape irrigation, industrial processes, toilet flushing, and groundwater replenishing (EPA, 2004)." A similar description is: "Water Reuse, the use of reclaimed water from treated wastewater, has been a long-established reality in many (semi)arid countries and regions. It helps to alleviate water scarcity by supplementing limited freshwater resources."  

The water that is used as an input to the treatment and reuse processes can be from a variety of sources. Usually it is wastewater (domestic or municipal, industrial or agricultural wastewater) but it could also come from urban runoff.

Overview 

Reclaimed water is water that is used more than one time before it passes back into the natural water cycle. Advances in municipal wastewater treatment technology allow communities to reuse water for many different purposes. The water is treated differently depending upon the source and use of the water and how it gets delivered.

Driving forces 
The World Health Organization has recognized the following principal driving forces for municipal wastewater reuse: 
increasing water scarcity and stress,
increasing populations and related food security issues,
increasing environmental pollution from improper wastewater disposal, and
increasing recognition of the resource value of wastewater, excreta and greywater.
Water recycling and reuse is of increasing importance, not only in arid regions but also in cities and contaminated environments.

Already, the groundwater aquifers that are used by over half of the world population are being over-drafted. Reuse will continue to increase as the world's population becomes increasingly urbanized and concentrated near coastlines, where local freshwater supplies are limited or are available only with large capital expenditure. Large quantities of freshwater can be saved by municipal wastewater reuse and recycling, reducing environmental pollution and improving carbon footprint. Reuse can be an alternative water supply option.

Achieving more sustainable sanitation and wastewater management will require emphasis on actions linked to resource management, such as wastewater reuse or excreta reuse that will keep valuable resources available for productive uses. This in turn supports human wellbeing and broader sustainability.

Potential benefits 
Water/wastewater reuse, as an alternative water source, can provide significant economic, social and environmental benefits, which are key motivators for implementing such reuse programs. These benefits include: 
 For cities and households: Increased water availability (drinking water substitution – keep drinking water for drinking and reclaimed water for non-drinking use (i.e. industry, cleaning, irrigation, domestic uses, toilet flushing, etc.)
 For the environment: Reduced nutrient loads to receiving waters (i.e. rivers, canals and other surface water resources); reduced over-abstraction of surface and groundwater; enhanced environmental protection by restoration of streams, wetlands and ponds; reduced energy consumption associated with production, treatment, and distribution of water (1.2 to 2.1 kWh/m3) compared to using deep groundwater resources, water importation or desalination 
 Reduced manufacturing costs of using high quality reclaimed water
 In agriculture: Irrigation with treated wastewater may contribute to improve production yields, reduce the ecological footprint and promote socioeconomic benefits.  It may also lead to reduced application of fertilizers (i.e. conservation of nutrients and reducing the need for artificial fertilizer (e.g. soil nutrition by the nutrients existing in the treated effluents).
Reclaiming water for reuse applications instead of using freshwater supplies can be a water-saving measure. When used water is eventually discharged back into natural water sources, it can still have benefits to ecosystems, improving streamflow, nourishing plant life and recharging aquifers, as part of the natural water cycle.

Scale

Global treated wastewater reuse is estimated at 40.7 billion m3 per year, representing approximately 11% of the total domestic and manufacturing wastewater produced. Municipal wastewater reuse is particularly high in the Middle East and North Africa region, in countries such as the UAE, Qatar, Kuwait and Israel.

For the Sustainable Development Goal 6 by the United Nations, Target 6.3 states "Halving the proportion of untreated wastewater and substantially increasing recycling and safe reuse globally by 2030".

Types and applications  

Treated wastewater can be reused in industry (for example in cooling towers), in artificial recharge of aquifers, in agriculture and in the rehabilitation of natural ecosystems (for example in wetlands). The main reclaimed water applications in the world are shown below:

Urban reuse 
In rarer cases reclaimed water is also used to augment drinking water supplies. Most of the uses of water reclamation are non potable uses such as washing cars, flushing toilets, cooling water for power plants, concrete mixing, artificial lakes, irrigation for golf courses and public parks, and for hydraulic fracturing. Where applicable, systems run a dual piping system to keep the recycled water separate from the potable water.

Usage types are distinguished as follows:
 Unrestricted: The use of reclaimed water for non-potable applications in municipal settings, where public access is not restricted.
 Restricted: The use of reclaimed water for non-potable applications in municipal settings, where public access is controlled or restricted by physical or institutional barriers, such as fencing, advisory signage, or temporal access restriction.

Agricultural reuse 

Irrigation with recycled municipal wastewater can also serve to fertilize plants if it contains nutrients, such as nitrogen, phosphorus and potassium. There are benefits of using recycled water for irrigation, including the lower cost compared to some other sources and consistency of supply regardless of season, climatic conditions and associated water restrictions. When reclaimed water is used for irrigation in agriculture, the nutrient (nitrogen and phosphorus) content of the treated wastewater has the benefit of acting as a fertilizer. This can make the reuse of excreta contained in sewage attractive.

The irrigation water can be used in different ways on different crops: For food crops to be eaten raw: crops which are intended for human consumption to be eaten raw or unprocessed. For processed food crops: crops which are intended for human consumption not to be eaten raw but after treatment process (i.e. cooked, industrially processed). It can also be used on non-food crops: crops which are not intended for human consumption (e.g. pastures, forage, fiber, ornamental, seed, forest and turf crops).

Risks in agricultural reuse 
In developing countries, agriculture is increasingly using untreated municipal wastewater for irrigation – often in an unsafe manner. Cities provide lucrative markets for fresh produce, so are attractive to farmers. However, because agriculture has to compete for increasingly scarce water resources with industry and municipal users, there is often no alternative for farmers but to use water polluted with urban waste directly to water their crops.

There can be significant health hazards related to using untreated wastewater in agriculture. Municipal wastewater can contain a mixture of chemical and biological pollutants. In low-income countries, there are often high levels of pathogens from excreta. In emerging nations, where industrial development is outpacing environmental regulation, there are increasing risks from inorganic and organic chemicals. The World Health Organization has developed guidelines for safe use of wastewater in 2006. These guidelines advocate a ‘multiple-barrier' approach wastewater use, for example by encouraging farmers to adopt various risk-reducing behaviors. These include ceasing irrigation a few days before harvesting to allow pathogens to die off in the sunlight, applying water carefully so it does not contaminate leaves likely to be eaten raw, cleaning vegetables with disinfectant or allowing fecal sludge used in farming to dry before being used as a human manure.

Drawbacks or risks often mentioned include the content of potentially harmful substances such as bacteria, heavy metals or organic pollutants (including pharmaceuticals, personal care products and pesticides). Irrigation with wastewater can have both positive and negative effects on soil and plants, depending on the composition of the wastewater and on the soil or plant characteristics.

Environmental reuse 
The use of reclaimed water to create, enhance, sustain, or augment water bodies including wetlands, aquatic habitats, or stream flow is called "environmental reuse". For example, constructed wetlands fed by wastewater provide both wastewater treatment and habitats for flora and fauna.

Industrial reuse  
Treated wastewater can be reused in industry (for example in cooling towers).

Planned potable reuse 
Planned potable reuse is publicly acknowledged as an intentional project to recycle water for drinking water. There are two ways in which potable water can be delivered for reuse – "Indirect Potable Reuse" (IPR) and "Direct Potable Reuse". Both these forms of reuse are described below, and commonly involve a more formal public process and public consultation program than is the case with de facto or unacknowledged reuse.

Some water agencies reuse highly treated effluent from municipal wastewater or resource recovery plants as a reliable, drought proof source of drinking water. By using advanced purification processes, they produce water that meets all applicable drinking water standards.  System reliability and frequent monitoring and testing are imperative to them meeting stringent controls.

The water needs of a community, water sources, public health regulations, costs, and the types of water infrastructure in place, such as distribution systems, man-made reservoirs, or natural groundwater basins, determine if and how reclaimed water can be part of the drinking water supply. Some communities reuse water to replenish groundwater basins. Others put it into surface water reservoirs. In these instances the reclaimed water is blended with other water supplies and/or sits in storage for a certain amount of time before it is drawn out and gets treated again at a water treatment or distribution system. In some communities, the reused water is put directly into pipelines that go to a water treatment plant or distribution system.

Modern technologies such as reverse osmosis and ultraviolet disinfection are commonly used when reclaimed water will be mixed with the drinking water supply.

Many people associate a feeling of disgust with reclaimed water and 13% of a survey group said they would not even sip it.
Nonetheless, the main health risk for potable use of reclaimed water is the potential for pharmaceutical and other household chemicals or their derivatives (environmental persistent pharmaceutical pollutants) to persist in this water. This would be less of a concern if human excreta was kept out of sewage by using dry toilets or preferably, systems that treat blackwater separately from greywater.

Indirect potable reuse 
Indirect potable reuse (IPR) means the water is delivered to the consumer indirectly.  After it is purified, the reused water blends with other supplies and/or sits a while in some sort of storage, man-made or natural, before it gets delivered to a pipeline that leads to a water treatment plant or distribution system. That storage could be a groundwater basin or a surface water reservoir.

Some municipalities are using and others are investigating IPR of reclaimed water. For example, reclaimed water may be pumped into (subsurface recharge) or percolated down to (surface recharge) groundwater aquifers, pumped out, treated again, and finally used as drinking water. This technique may also be referred to as groundwater recharging. This includes slow processes of further multiple purification steps via the layers of earth/sand (absorption) and microflora in the soil (biodegradation).

IPR or even unplanned potable use of reclaimed wastewater is used in many countries, where the latter is discharged into groundwater to hold back saline intrusion in coastal aquifers. IPR has generally included some type of environmental buffer, but conditions in certain areas have created an urgent need for more direct alternatives.
 
IPR occurs through the augmentation of drinking water supplies with municipal wastewater treated to a level suitable for IPR followed by an environmental buffer (e.g. rivers, dams, aquifers, etc.) that precedes drinking water treatment. In this case, municipal wastewater passes through a series of treatment steps that encompasses membrane filtration and separation processes (e.g. MF, UF and RO), followed by an advanced chemical oxidation process (e.g. UV, UV+H2O2, ozone). In ‘indirect' potable reuse applications, the reclaimed wastewater is used directly or mixed with other sources.

Direct potable reuse 
Direct potable reuse (DPR) means the reused water is put directly into pipelines that go to a water treatment plant or distribution system.  Direct potable reuse may occur with or without "engineered storage" such as underground or above ground tanks. In other words, DPR is the introduction of reclaimed water derived from domestic wastewater after extensive treatment and monitoring to assure that strict water quality requirements are met at all times, directly into a municipal water supply system.

Reuse in space stations 
Wastewater reclamation can be especially important in relation to human spaceflight. In 1998, NASA announced it had built a human waste reclamation bioreactor designed for use in the International Space Station and a crewed Mars mission. Human urine and feces are input into one end of the reactor and pure oxygen, pure water, and compost (humanure) are output from the other end. The soil could be used for growing vegetables, and the bioreactor also produces electricity.

Aboard the International Space Station, astronauts have been able to drink recycled urine due to the introduction of the ECLSS system.  The system costs $250 million and has been working since May 2009. The system recycles wastewater and urine back into potable water used for drinking, food preparation, and oxygen generation.  This cuts back on the need for resupplying the space station so often.

De facto wastewater reuse (unplanned potable reuse) 
De facto, unacknowledged or unplanned potable reuse refers to a situation where reuse of treated wastewater is, in fact, practiced but is not officially recognized. For example, a sewage treatment plant from one city may be discharging effluents to a river which is used as a drinking water supply for another city downstream.

Unplanned Indirect Potable Use has existed for a long time. Large towns on the River Thames upstream of London (Oxford, Reading, Swindon, Bracknell) discharge their treated sewage ("non-potable water") into the Thames, which supplies water to London downstream. In the United States, the Mississippi River serves as both the destination of sewage treatment plant effluent and the source of potable water.

Design considerations

Distribution 

Non-potable reclaimed water is often distributed with a dual piping network that keeps reclaimed water pipes completely separate from potable water pipes.

In many cities using reclaimed water, it is now in such demand that consumers are only allowed to use it on assigned days. Some cities that previously offered unlimited reclaimed water at a flat rate are now beginning to charge citizens by the amount they use.

Treatment processes 

There are several technologies used to treat wastewater for reuse. A combination of these technologies can meet strict treatment standards and make sure that the processed water is hygienically safe, meaning free from pathogens. The following are some of the typical technologies: Ozonation, ultrafiltration, aerobic treatment (membrane bioreactor), forward osmosis, reverse osmosis, advanced oxidation. Reclaimed water providers use multi-barrier treatment processes and constant monitoring to ensure that reclaimed water is safe and treated properly for the intended end use.

Some water demanding activities do not require high grade water. In this case, wastewater can be reused with little or no treatment. One example of this scenario is in the domestic environment where toilets can be flushed using greywater from baths and showers with little or no treatment.

In the case of municipal wastewater, the wastewater must pass through numerous sewage treatment process steps before it can be used. Steps might include screening, primary settling, biological treatment, tertiary treatment (for example reverse osmosis), and disinfection.

Wastewater is generally treated to only secondary level treatment when used for irrigation.

A pump station distributes reclaimed water to users around the city. This may include golf courses, agricultural uses, cooling towers, or in land fills.

Alternative options 
Rather than treating municipal wastewater for reuse purposes, other options can achieve similar effects of freshwater savings: 
 Greywater reuse systems – at a household level, treated or untreated greywater may be used for flush toilets or to water the garden. 
 Rainwater harvesting and stormwater recovery – Urban design systems which incorporate rainwater harvesting and reduce runoff are known as water-sensitive urban design (WSUD) in Australia, low-impact development (LID) in the United States and sustainable urban drainage systems (SUDS) in the United Kingdom.   
 Seawater desalination – an energy-intensive process where salt and other minerals are removed from seawater to produce potable water for drinking and irrigation, typically through membrane filtration (reverse osmosis), and steam-distillation.

Costs  
The cost of reclaimed water exceeds that of potable water in many regions of the world, where a fresh water supply is plentiful. However, reclaimed water is usually sold to citizens at a cheaper rate to encourage its use. As fresh water supplies become limited from distribution costs, increased population demands, or climate change reducing sources, the cost ratios will evolve also. The evaluation of reclaimed water needs to consider the entire water supply system, as it may bring important value of flexibility into the overall system 

Reclaimed water systems usually require a dual piping network, often with additional storage tanks, which adds to the costs of the system.

Barriers to implementation 
Barriers to water reclamation may include:
 Full-scale implementation and operation of water reuse schemes still face regulatory, economic, social and institutional challenges. 
 Low economic viability of water reuse schemes. This may partly be due to costs of water quality monitoring and identification of contaminants. Difficulties in contaminant identification may include the separation of inorganic and organic pollutants, microorganisms, colloids, and others. Full cost recovery from water reuse schemes is difficult. There is a lack of financial water pricing systems comparable to already subsidized conventional treatment plants.
Psychological barriers, sometimes referred to as the "yuck factor", can also be an impediment to implementation, particularly for direct potable reuse plans. These psychological factors are closely associated with disgust, specifically pathogen avoidance.

Health aspects 

Reclaimed water is considered safe when appropriately used. Reclaimed water planned for use in recharging aquifers or augmenting surface water receives adequate and reliable treatment before mixing with naturally occurring water and undergoing natural restoration processes. Some of this water eventually becomes part of drinking water supplies.

A study published in 2009 compared the water quality differences of reclaimed/recycled water, surface water, and groundwater.  Results indicate that reclaimed water, surface water, and groundwater are more similar than dissimilar with regard to constituents. The researchers tested for 244 representative constituents typically found in water. When detected, most constituents were in the parts per billion and parts per trillion range. DEET (an insect repellant) and caffeine were found in all water types and virtually in all samples. Triclosan (in antibacterial soap and toothpaste) was found in all water types, but detected in higher levels (parts per trillion) in reclaimed water than in surface or groundwater. Very few hormones/steroids were detected in samples, and when detected were at very low levels. Haloacetic acids (a disinfection by-product) were found in all types of samples, even groundwater. The largest difference between reclaimed water and the other waters appears to be that reclaimed water has been disinfected and thus has disinfection by-products (due to chlorine use).

A 2005 study found that there had been no incidences of illness or disease from either microbial pathogens or chemicals, and the risks of using reclaimed water for irrigation are not measurably different from irrigation using potable water.

A 2012 study conducted by the National Research Council in the United States of America found that the risk of exposure to certain microbial and chemical contaminants from drinking reclaimed water does not appear to be any higher than the risk experienced in at least some current drinking water treatment systems, and may be orders of magnitude lower. This report recommends adjustments to the federal regulatory framework that could enhance public health protection for both planned and unplanned (or de facto) reuse and increase public confidence in water reuse.

Environmental aspects 

Using reclaimed water for non-potable uses saves potable water for drinking, since less potable water will be used for non-potable uses.

It sometimes contains higher levels of nutrients such as nitrogen, phosphorus and oxygen which may somewhat help fertilize garden and agricultural plants when used for irrigation.

Fresh water makes up less than 3% of the world's water resources, and just 1% of that is readily available. Even though fresh water is scarce, just 3% of it is extracted for human consumption. The remaining water is mostly used for agriculture, which uses roughly two thirds of all fresh water.

Reclaimed water can offer a viable and effective alternative where freshwater supplies are scarce. Reclaimed water is utilized to maintain or increase lake levels, restore wetlands, and restore river flows during hot weather and droughts, protecting biodiversity. Additionally, reclaimed water is utilized for street cleaning, irrigation of urban green spaces, and industrial processes. Reclaimed water has the advantage of being a consistent source of water supply that is unaffected by seasonal droughts and weather changes.

The usage of water reclamation decreases the pollution sent to sensitive environments.  It can also enhance wetlands, which benefits the wildlife depending on that ecosystem. It also helps to stop the chances of drought as recycling of water reduces the use of fresh water supply from underground sources.  For instance, the San Jose/Santa Clara Water Pollution Control Plant instituted a water recycling program to protect the San Francisco Bay area's natural salt water marshes.

The main potential risks that are associated with reclaimed wastewater reuse for irrigation purposes, when the treatment is not adequate are the following: 
 contamination of the food chain with microcontaminants, pathogens (i.e. bacteria, viruses, protozoa, helminths), or antibiotic resistance determinants; 
 soil salinization and accumulation of various unknown constituents that might adversely affect agricultural production; 
 distribution of the indigenous soil microbial communities;
 alteration of the physicochemical and microbiological properties of the soil and contribution to the accumulation of chemical/biological contaminants (e.g. heavy metals, chemicals (i.e. boron, nitrogen, phosphorus, chloride, sodium, pesticides/herbicides), natural chemicals (i.e. hormones), contaminants of emerging concern (CECs) (i.e. pharmaceuticals and their metabolites, personal care products, household chemicals and food additives and their transformation products), etc.) in it and subsequent uptake by plants and crops; 
 excessive growth of algae and vegetation in canals carrying wastewater (i.e. eutrophication); 
 groundwater quality degradation by the various reclaimed water contaminants, migrating and accumulating in the soil and aquifers.

Guidelines and regulations

International organizations 

 World Health Organization (WHO): "Guidelines for the safe use of wastewater, excreta and greywater" (2006). 
 United Nations Environment Programme (UNEP): "Guidelines for municipal wastewater reuse in the Mediterranean region" (2005).
 United Nations Water Decade Programme on Capacity Development (UNW-DPC): Proceedings on the UNWater project "Safe use of wastewater in agriculture" (2013).

European Union 

Since May 25, 2020, there is an EU regulation on minimum requirements for water reuse for irrigation purposes. It shall apply from June 26, 2023. The water quality requirements are divided into four categories depending on what is irrigated and how the irrigation is performed. The water quality parameters included are E.coli, BOD5, Total suspended solids (TSS), turbidity, legionella, and intestinal nematodes (helminth eggs).

In the Water Framework Directive, reuse of water is mentioned as one of the possible measures to achieve the Directive's quality goals, however this remains a relatively vague recommendation rather than a requirement: Part B of Annex VI refers to reuse as one of the "supplementary measures which Member States within each river basin district may choose to adopt as part of the programme of measures required under Article 11(4)".

Besides that, Article 12 of the Urban Wastewater Treatment Directive concerning the reuse of treated wastewater states that "treated wastewater shall be reused whenever appropriate", is not specific enough to promote water reuse and it leaves too much room for interpretation as to what can be considered as an "appropriate" situation to reuse treated wastewater.

Despite the lack of common water reuse criteria at the EU level, several Member States (MS) have issued their own legislative frameworks, regulations, or guidelines for different water reuse applications (e.g. Cyprus, France, Greece, Italy, and Spain).

However, after an evaluation carried out by the European Commission (EC) on the water reuse standards of several member states it was concluded that they differ in their approach. There are important divergences among the different standards regarding the permitted uses, the parameters to be monitored, and the limit values allowed. This lack of harmonization among water reuse standards might create some trade barriers for agricultural goods irrigated with reclaimed water. Once on the common market, the level of safety in the producing member states may be not considered as sufficient by the importing countries. The most representative standards on wastewater reuse from European member states are the following: 
 Cyprus: Law 106 (I) 2002 Water and Soil pollution control and associated regulations (KDP 772/2003, KDP 269/2005) (Issuing Institutions: Ministry of Agriculture, Natural resources and Environment, Water Development Department).
 France: Jorf num.0153, 4 July 2014. Order of 2014, related to the use of water from treated urban wastewater for irrigation of crops and green areas (Issuing Institutions: Ministry of Public Health, Ministry of Agriculture, Food and Fisheries, Ministry of Ecology, Energy and Sustainability). 
 Greece: CMD No 145116. Measures, limits and procedures for reuse of treated wastewater (Issuing Institutions: Ministry of Environment, Energy and Climate Change). 
 Italy: DM 185/2003. Technical measures for reuse of wastewater (Issuing Institutions: Ministry of Environment, Ministry of Agriculture, Ministry of Public Health).
 Portugal: NP 4434 2005. Reuse of reclaimed urban water for irrigation (Issuing Institutions: Portuguese Institute for Quality). 
 Spain: RD 1620/2007. The legal framework for the reuse of treated wastewater (Issuing Institutions: Ministry of Environment, Ministry of Agriculture, Food and Fisheries, Ministry of Health).
By 2023, a new EU agriculture law may raise water reuse by six times, from 1.7 billion m3 to 6.6 billion m3, and cut water stress by 5%.

United States 
In the U.S., the Clean Water Act of 1972 mandated elimination of the discharge of untreated waste from municipal and industrial sources to make water safe for fishing and recreation. The US federal government provided billions of dollars in grants for building sewage treatment plants around the country. Modern treatment plants, usually using oxidation and/or chlorination in addition to primary and secondary treatment, were required to meet certain standards.

Los Angeles County's sanitation districts started providing treated wastewater for landscape irrigation in parks and golf courses in 1929.  The first reclaimed water facility in California was built at San Francisco's Golden Gate Park in 1932.  The Water Replenishment District of Southern California was the first groundwater agency to obtain permitted use of recycled water for groundwater recharge in 1962.

Denver's Direct Potable Water Reuse Demonstration Project examined the technical, scientific, and public acceptance aspects of DPR from 1979 to 1993.  A chronic lifetime whole-animal health effects study on the 1 MGD advanced treatment plant product augmented a comprehensive assessment of the chemical and microbiological water quality.  The $30 million study found that the water produced met all health standards and compared favorably with Denver's high quality drinking water.  Further, the projected cost was lower than estimates for obtaining distant new water supplies.

Reclaimed water is not regulated by the U.S. Environmental Protection Agency (EPA), but the EPA has developed water reuse guidelines that were most recently updated in 2012. The EPA Guidelines for Water Reuse represents the international standard for best practices in water reuse. The document was developed under a Cooperative Research and Development Agreement between the EPA, the U.S. Agency for International Development (USAID), and the global consultancy CDM Smith. The Guidelines provide a framework for states to develop regulations that incorporate the best practices and address local requirements.

Trade associations
 The WateReuse Association is a trade association in the United States which promotes reuse of water.  According to their website, "The WateReuse Association is the nation's only trade association solely dedicated to advancing laws, policy, funding, and public acceptance of recycled water. WateReuse represents a coalition of utilities that recycle water, businesses that support the development of recycled water projects, and consumers of recycled water." The WateReuse Research Foundation was merged into the WateReuse Association on July 11, 2016.

Other countries
 Canada: "Canadian guidelines for domestic reclaimed water for use in toilet and urinal flushing" (2010).
 China: China National Reclaimed Water Quality Standard; China National Standard GB/T 18920-2002, GB/T 19923-2005, GB/T 18921-2002, GB 20922-2007 and GB/T 19772-2005. 
 Israel: Ministry of Health regulation (2005). 
 Japan: National Institute for Land and Infrastructure Management: Report of the Microbial Water Quality Project on Treated Sewage and Reclaimed Wastewater (2008). 
 Jordan: Jordanian technical base n. 893/2006 Jordan water reuse management Plan (policy). 
 Mexico: Mexican Standard NOM-001-ECOL-1996 governing wastewater reuse in Agriculture. 
 South Africa: The latest revision of the Water Services Act of 1997 relating to grey-water and treated effluent (Department of Water Affairs and Forestry, 2001).
 Tunisia: Standard for the use of treated wastewater in agriculture (NT 106-109 of 1989) and list of crops that can be irrigated with treated wastewater (Ministry of Agriculture, 1994). 
 Australia National level Guidelines: Government of Australia (the Natural Resource Management Ministerial Council, the Environment Protection and Heritage Council, and the Australian Health Ministers Conference (NRMMC-EPHC-AHMC)): Guidelines for water recycling: managing health and environmental risks" Phase 1, 2006.

History 

Wastewater reuse (planned or unplanned) is an ancient practice, which has been applied since the dawn of human history and is closely connected to the development of sanitation provision.

Country examples

Australia

Israel

Namibia

Singapore

South Africa

See also 
 Water conservation
 WateReuse

References

Water conservation
Water supply
Irrigation
Water treatment
Sanitation
Sustainable technologies
Sustainable agriculture
Recycling by material
Reuse
Hydrology and urban planning